Raino Olavi Westerholm (20 November 1919 – 1 June 2017) was a Finnish politician. Westerholm was born in Kuusankoski. He was leader of the Finnish Christian League from 1973 to 1982. He was also member of the Finnish parliament from 1970 to 1979.

Westerholm ran for president twice, in the 1978 and 1982 elections.

References 

|-

|-

1919 births
2017 deaths
People from Kuusankoski
Christian Democrats (Finland) politicians
Members of the Parliament of Finland (1970–72)
Members of the Parliament of Finland (1972–75)
Members of the Parliament of Finland (1975–79)